In Greek mythology, the mountainous district of Nysa, variously associated with Ethiopia, Libya, Boeotia, Thrace, India or Arabia by Greek mythographers, was the traditional place where the rain nymphs, the Hyades, raised the infant god Dionysus, the "God of Nysa".

Mythology
Though the worship of Dionysus came into mainland Greece from Asia Minor (where the Hittites called themselves "Nesi" and their language "Nesili"), the various locations assigned to Nysa may simply be conventions to show that a romantically remote and mythical land was envisaged. The name Nysa may even be an invention to explain the god's name. Even Homer mentions the mountain Nyseion as the place where Dionysus, under the protection of the nymphs, grew up. Hesychius of Alexandria (5th century Byzantine lexicon) gives a list of the following locations proposed by ancient authors as the site of Mount Nysa: Arabia, Ethiopia, Egypt, Babylon, Erythraian Sea (the Red Sea), Thrace, Thessaly, Cilicia, India, Libya, Lydia, Macedonia, Naxos, around Pangaios (mythical island south of Arabia), Syria. On his return from Nysa to join his fellow Olympians, Dionysus brought the entheogen wine.

According to Sir William Jones, "Meros is said by the Greeks to have been a mountain in India, on which their Dionysos was born, and that Meru, though it generally means the north pole in Indian geography, is also a mountain near the city of Naishada or Nysa, called by the Greek geographers Dionysopolis, and universally celebrated in the Sanskrit poems".

When Alexander the Great arrived at the city of Nysa, representatives of the city met him and told him not to capture the city and the land because the god Dionysus had founded the city and he named it Nysa, after the nymph.

During the Hellenistic period, "Nysa" was personified as Dionysus' nursemaid, and she was said to be buried at the town of Scythopolis (Beit She'an) in Israel, which claimed Dionysus as its founder.

Notes

External links 
 Dictionary of Ancient Deities

Dionysus in mythology
Greek mythology of Anatolia
Locations in Greek mythology
Fictional regions